Cristo Rey High School Sacramento is a private, Roman Catholic high school in Sacramento, California, situated on the corner of Jackson and Florin-Perkins Roads.  It is in the Roman Catholic Diocese of Sacramento.

History
Cristo Rey opened in Sacramento in August, 2006 to serve students from lower-income families, with over 90% qualifying for the federal free or reduced lunch program.  It is part of the Cristo Rey Network of high schools, the original being Cristo Rey Jesuit High School in Chicago. The school is co-sponsored by the Society of Jesus (Jesuits), the Sisters of Mercy, and the Sisters of Notre Dame de Namur.

On Thursday, June 3, 2010, Cristo Rey HS had its first graduation class. The ceremony was held at St. Ignatius Loyola Church. The class consisted of 53 students, all of whom were accepted into colleges and universities.

In 2017 the family share of the tuition was $2,300 and the school listed 120 corporate partners in its Work-Study Program.

Activities 
All students make a one-day retreat their first three years and an overnight retreat their final year. The required service hours for all students grows each year, from 20 to 25 to 30 to 40 hours.

Student clubs include Student Government, Cyber Patriots, Mathletes, La Raza Unida, Student Ambassadors, SHPE, Pro-Life, Student Art, Drama, Yearbook Club, Garden Club, Peer Mentor Club, Music Ministry Club, Campus Ministry, Yoga Club, and Pacific Islander Club.

Sponsored sports include Cross Country, Track & Field, Basketball (Men's & Women's), Soccer (Men's & Women's), and Volleyball.

Book about the Cristo Rey Model 
In January 2008, Loyola Press released a book entitled More than A Dream: How One School's Vision is Changing the World.  The book, authored by G.R. Kearney, a writer and former volunteer teacher at Cristo Rey Jesuit High School in Chicago, documents the unlikely development of the Cristo Rey model and its remarkable success throughout the United States.

References

External links
 School Website 
 Cristo Rey Network

Catholic secondary schools in California
Educational institutions established in 2006
Cristo Rey Network
Jesuit high schools in the United States
High schools in Sacramento, California
Poverty-related organizations
Roman Catholic Diocese of Sacramento
2006 establishments in California